Ri Son-gwon is a North Korean politician and diplomat who has served as chairman of the Committee for the Peaceful Reunification of the Fatherland. In January 2020, he was named in media reports as the successor for Foreign Minister Ri Yong-ho.

Career
Ri led a North Korean delegation for the first high-level inter-Korean talks in more than two years in January 2018. He was once known the right-hand man of Kim Yong-chol, and appeared at a second round of inter-Korean working-level military talks in October 2006. He also served as a Senior Colonel within the Korean People's Army.

References

Living people
Foreign ministers of North Korea
Year of birth missing (living people)
Place of birth missing (living people)
Members of the 8th Central Committee of the Workers' Party of Korea